Hwang Ji-yoon (born May 28, 1983) is a South Korean footballer. He previously played for Jeju United FC, Bucheon SK, Daegu FC, Daejeon Citizen and Sangju Sangmu.

References

External links

1983 births
Living people
Association football defenders
South Korean footballers
Jeju United FC players
Daegu FC players
Daejeon Hana Citizen FC players
Gimcheon Sangmu FC players
K League 1 players
Ajou University alumni